USS Venture (SP-616) was a Venture-class patrol boat acquired by the U.S. Navy for the task of patrolling the coastal waters of the New England coast during World War I. Her primary task was to guard the coastal area against German submarines.

The first ship to be named Venture by the Navy, SP-616—a wooden-hulled, screw steam yacht designed by F. D. Lawley and completed as Shadow in 1916 at South Boston, Massachusetts, by George Lawley & Son—was acquired by the Navy under free lease from Mrs. Sarah L. Silsbee of Isleboro Island, Maine, on 28 April 1917 and commissioned the same day.

World War I service 
 
Attached to the 5th Section, 1st Naval District, Portsmouth, New Hampshire, Venture operated out of the Portsmouth Navy Yard at Kittery, Maine, through the end of World War I, conducting security patrols and performing dispatch duties.

End-of-war decommissioning 

Following the armistice, she was decommissioned on 5 February 1919 and returned to her owner.

References

External links 
 Photo gallery at navsource.org

Patrol vessels of the United States Navy
Ships built in Boston
1916 ships
World War I patrol vessels of the United States
Steam yachts